Gamagara Local Municipality is an administrative area in the John Taolo Gaetsewe District of the Northern Cape in South Africa.

The name Gamogara is of Setswana origin. The municipality is named after a dry river which was in turn named after a man called Mogara of the Makwere clan (Batlhaping). During the early days of exploration, Mogara was the first person to settle in this part of the country. After 1887, the area became dominated by white farmers who then changed the name as they were unable to pronounce it correctly. Hence it was called Gamagara instead of Gamogara. The name is derived from a dry river that ran from Dibeng to join the Kuruman (Segonyana) river at Dikgatlong tsa ga Kganyile. Incidentally this is the route the Ba ga Motlhware followed on their way to their headquarters, Maje a Mokhothu (Langeberg).

Main places
The 2001 census divided the municipality into the following main places:

Politics 

The municipal council consists of fifteen members elected by mixed-member proportional representation. Eight councillors are elected by first-past-the-post voting in eight wards, while the remaining seven are chosen from party lists so that the total number of party representatives is proportional to the number of votes received. In the election of 1 November 2021 no party obtained a majority of seats on the council. The following table shows the results of the election.

References

External links
 Official website

Local municipalities of the John Taolo Gaetsewe District Municipality